The Davao Chinatown is the Chinatown located in Davao City and the only one in Mindanao. It is the primary residential area of the Chinese Philippine community in the city. The area is bordered by Santa Ana Avenue, Monteverde Avenue, Ramón Magsaysay Street and León García Street. It is the Philippines' largest Chinatown by area with a total land area of 44 hectares and is part of four barangays.

History 
In 2003, the city's then mayor Rodrigo Duterte issued an executive order declaring portions of Barangays 27-C and 30-C where Filipino Chinese residences and businesses were concentrated to be the city's Chinatown.

The Davao City Chinatown Development Council (DCCDC) was established to assist the conservation of the area's cultural heritage and the implementation of policies in that regard. It is also charged with the management of commerce in the area. The Council saw it fitting to formally launch the city's own Chinatown during the Chinese New Year 2009, which fell on January 26, through a week-long festival that ran from January 24 through January 31 of that year.

The archways
These 4 archways in Davao Chinatown are donated and sponsored by the Chinese Philippine community:

The first arch is the Arch of Friendship (友誼門), located near Jones Circle;
The second one is the Unity Arch (融合門), located at the end of Magsaysay Avenue where its own seaport is located;
The third one is the Arch of Peace (和平門), located at the corner of Santa Ana and J. P. Laurel Avenues right beside Davao Chong Hua High School;
The fourth and last arch is the Arch of Prosperity (繁榮門), located along Santa Ana Avenue and León García Street.

The Chinese archways are inspired by páilou (牌樓) or páifāng (牌坊), a traditional style of Chinese architectural arch in China.

Places of worship

Temples are the place of worship for Buddhism and Taoism. These notable temples are also visited by tourists visiting in the city.

Long Hua Buddhist Temple is the largest Buddhist temple in the island of Mindanao, it is located on J.P. Cabaguio Avenue in Agdao District. It is 3-4 kilometers northeast of the center of the city.
Polian Temple is one of the oldest Buddhist Temples in Davao City. The Polian Temple is located on Quirino Avenue, between Emilio Jacinto Extension and J. P. Laurel Ave. It is surrounded by high walls.
Santiago Temple is situated on a property near Gaisano Mall of Davao. Built in 1957, it was once visible from J. P. Laurel Avenue but a new building was built in front of it. Until now it was hidden from direct view that is accessible only by a narrow street alley.
The Mindanao Taoist Temple is located between Cabaguio Ave. and Dacudao, Adgao District.
Davao Chinese Baptist Church, located at Guzman St, Poblacion District, Davao City
The Santa Ana Parish Church is a Catholic church located on Santa Ana Avenue.

Establishments
Shopping malls, hardware stores, restaurants, retail and wholesale stores can be found within the Chinatown. It is the major trade hub of Chinese Filipinos in Davao City. Affordable and cheap goods such as fruits, vegetables and dry goods are available in small kiosks and stalls.

Institutions located within Chinatown, such as Davao Chong Hua High School, a non-sectarian private Chinese school, offer Chinese language and culture classes to students in the Philippines.

Transportation
Jeepneys and multicabs are accessible within the city. Cabs have several destinations and are built with GPS or the Global Positioning System.

See also
Chinatown
Chinatowns in Asia
Binondo
List of ethnic enclaves in Philippine cities

References

Chinatowns in Asia
Davao City
Chinese-Filipino culture